Fourth-seeded Fred Stolle defeated Tony Roche 3–6, 6–0, 6–2, 6–3 in the final to win the men's singles tennis title at the 1965 French Championships.

Seeds
The seeded players are listed below. Fred Stolle is the champion; others show the round in which they were eliminated.

  Manuel Santana (second round)
  Roy Emerson (semifinals)
  Nicola Pietrangeli (fourth round)
  Fred Stolle (champion)
  Pierre Darmon (fourth round)
  Martin Mulligan (third round)
  Neale Fraser (second round)
  Cliff Drysdale (semifinals)
  Ramanathan Krishnan (fourth round)
  Keith Diepraam (second round)
  Frank A. Froehling (second round)
  John Newcombe (quarterfinals)
  István Gulyás (second round)
  Tony Roche (final)
  Jaidip Mukerjea (fourth round)
  Michael Sangster (second round)

Draw

Key
 Q = Qualifier
 WC = Wild card
 LL = Lucky loser
 r = Retired

Finals

Earlier rounds

Section 1

Section 2

Section 3

Section 4

Section 5

Section 6

Section 7

Section 8

External links
   on the French Open website

1965
1965 in French tennis